Martin & Orloff is a 2002 feature film written by and starring Matt Walsh and Ian Roberts, best known as half of the Upright Citizens Brigade comedy troupe, along with Ian's wife Katie Roberts.  The film was produced and directed by Lawrence Blume and features an ensemble cast of alternative comedians including H. Jon Benjamin, David Cross, Andy Richter, Matt Besser, Amy Poehler, Tina Fey, Janeane Garofalo, and Rachel Dratch, as well as actress Kim Raver as Orloff's girlfriend.

Martin and Orloff is available on DVD through Anchor Bay Entertainment and made its television debut on Comedy Central (Summer 2006).

Plot
Martin, who had previously tried to kill himself following the so-called "Eggroll Incident", has been released from the mental hospital. He goes back to work, where he designs corporate mascot costumes. He's not completely recovered yet, though, and is recommended to Dr. Orloff, who is possibly the worst doctor in the world. Martin's first appointment consists of a single question. They skip out on the rest of the appointment to go to a softball game, which Orloff drags Martin to. Screwball adventures ensue.

Cast
 Ian Roberts as Martin Flam, a recently suicidal man
 Matt Walsh as Dr. Eric Orloff, an incompetent psychiatrist
 H. Jon Benjamin as Keith, Orloff's Gulf War veteran friend
 Amy Poehler as Patty, Orloff's co-dependent stripper friend
 Kim Raver as Kashia, Orloff's girlfriend
 Matt Besser as Ron, Martin's boss
 Les Mau as Mr. Chan, a client of Martin's
 David Cross as Don Wassermann
 Katie Roberts as Donna
 Sal E. Graziano as Jimbo, Patty's ex-boyfriend
 Marylouise Burke as Mrs. Flam
 Miriam Tolan as Linda
 Teddy Coluca as Petros
 Jake T. Austin as boy with balloon (uncredited)

Reception
Metacritic assigned a score of 48 out of 100 based on 11 critics, indicating "mixed or average reviews".

Accolades
The film has won numerous awards including:
Texas Chainsaw Massacre Film Festival (Winner: Director’s Prize)
Sarasota Film Festival ( “Best of Fest” Award)
East Lansing Film Festival (Winner: Audience Award: Best Feature)
The Art Institute of Chicago (Winner: Christopher Wetzel Award for Independent Comedy)
High Times Magazine Stoney Award: Best Unreleased film of 2003 (nominee)
IFP/West Independent Spirit Award: Motorola Producer of the Year
Top Ten Films of 2003: Chicago Reader
Hollywood Reporter: 2002 Ten Rising Stars of Comedy: Lawrence Blume

References

External links
Official site

2002 comedy films
2002 films
2003 films
American comedy films
2003 comedy films
2000s English-language films
2000s American films